Freejack is a 1992 American science fiction cyberpunk action film directed by Geoff Murphy and starring Emilio Estevez, Mick Jagger, Rene Russo, and Anthony Hopkins. The screenplay was written by Steven Pressfield, Ronald Shusett (who also produced), and Dan Gilroy and loosely adapted from the 1959 science fiction novel Immortality, Inc. by Robert Sheckley.

The film was produced by Morgan Creek and released by Warner Bros. in the United States on January 17, 1992. It received mostly negative reviews.

Plot
In 2009, the super-wealthy achieve immortality by hiring "bonejackers", mercenaries equipped with time travel devices, to snatch people from the past, just prior to the moment of their deaths, for use as substitute bodies. Those who escape are known as "freejacks" and are considered less than human under the law. In this dystopian future, most people suffer from poor physical health as a result of rampant drug use and environmental pollution, making them unattractive as replacement bodies.

Alex Furlong is a Formula One racer who is about to die in a spectacular 1991 crash when a time machine snatches him from the cockpit and into 21st century New York City, now a futuristic dystopia populated by scavengers and killers. When Furlong's captors are ambushed by a hit squad, Furlong escapes from Victor Vacendak, a hardened mercenary who has snatched him on behalf of the powerful McCandless Corporation. Alex's former fiancée Julie Redlund is now an executive at McCandless, handling high-stakes mineral negotiations with a rival Japanese firm.

Alex spends much time escaping the clutches of Victor, a ruthless pursuer who nevertheless lives by a code of honor and rekindling his relationship with Julie. Ian McCandless, Julie's boss, is revealed to have died and seeks to install his backed-up personality into Furlong's body. Besides evading Vacendak's army of mercenaries and McCandless police personnel, Alex and Julie also have to deal with fleeing from the private guards of McCandless's corporate X.O., Mark Michelette, who is gunning for McCandless's position. Alex finds he cannot trust his old friends from 1991, who are now eager to sell him out.

After an encounter wherein Furlong spares Vacendak's life, Julie rescues Furlong in one of Vacendak's vehicles. Tired of running, Furlong pretends to take Julie hostage and negotiates with Michelette to arrange a meeting, counting on Michelette's not knowing about their past relationship; however, Michelette has seen the footage of Julie's grief after Alex's 1991 accident. After she slaps Michelette in return for his mockery, the couple flees. They are thwarted when they encounter a gunfight in the lobby between two factions, now in opposition: McCandless's security guards and Vacendak's mercenaries. Julie plans to leave the building through an "escape module" on the hundredth floor, but the elevator takes them automatically to the complex at the very top of the building known as the "Spiritual Switchboard" where McCandless's mind is in storage. In a virtual reality encounter with McCandless's essence, he explains his goal: to use Alex's body to satiate his love for Julie. Apologizing, he offers to die and let Alex run the company under the guise of being McCandless.

As they consider the offer, Vacendak arrives, and McCandless reveals he was merely stalling for time. Alex fights the process as Michelette stumbles in, wounded from fighting Vacendak's soldiers. In the confusion, Julie grabs the gun of the soldier holding her and fires off a shot that disrupts the transfer process. The results are inconclusive as to whether or not it is McCandless or Furlong in Alex's body now. The scientists cannot determine the answer, but Vacendak can, as only Vacendak knows a secret code McCandless gave him.

Alex reads the code, slowly, and Vacendak asks him to continue. Alex finishes the code quickly. Michelette tries to kill Alex but is gunned down by Vacendak's men. Alex remarks about how he feels in his "new" body, before telling Julie that she will be dressed more appropriately so that the two of them can take a drive. Hours later, after the coup is over, Julie and Alex get into one of McCandless's favorite vehicles; Alex tells the driver that he will do the driving today. Vacendak stops them as the car leaves the estate. It turns out that the transfer was not complete after all; Furlong got McCandless's secret number wrong, but Vacendak went along with it. He simply waited until Furlong made a mistake: McCandless did not know how to drive. Vacendak admonishes Julie that "you'll have to coach him better than that", then leaves while Furlong and Julie speed away.

Cast

Production
The role of Julie Redlund was originally going to be played by Linda Fiorentino, but due to scheduling conflicts she dropped out and Rene Russo signed on to replace her.
Shooting took place in Atlanta, Georgia.

According to reports at the time of the production and interviews with some members of the cast and crew, the original version of the movie had a disastrous test screening, so producer Ronald Shusett was brought in to re-shoot around 40% of the movie and add more character scenes and humor. Emilio Estevez also mentioned how director Geoff Murphy let them down by focusing too much on action in his original cut of the film. Geoff Murphy claims that there was interference from production company Morgan Creek and that he asked for his possessory credit to be removed.

Reception

Critical reception

The film received negative reviews from critics. On Rotten Tomatoes, it has an approval rating of 26% based on reviews from 19 critics, with an average rating of 4.2/10. Audiences surveyed by CinemaScore gave the film a grade B−. Owen Gleiberman at Entertainment Weekly described it routine urban chase thriller with sci-fi gimmicks, and a "cheap mishmash of Blade Runner, RoboCop, and Total Recall."

On the Late Show with David Letterman, Anthony Hopkins called the film "terrible".

Box office
The film was a box office bomb as it grossed only $17 million in the United States and Canada and $20 million internationally for a worldwide total of $37 million, based on a $30 million budget.

Home video releases
Freejack was released on VHS and Laserdisc in 1992, a DVD release following in 2002, and a Blu-ray release in November 2018 by Sony Pictures Home Entertainment.

Other media
In 1992, NOW Comics published a three-part miniseries based on the movie. The adaptation was ghostwritten by Clint McElroy.

References

External links
 
 
 

1992 films
1990s chase films
1990s science fiction action films
1990s dystopian films
American chase films
American science fiction action films
American post-apocalyptic films
Adaptations of works by Robert Sheckley
American auto racing films
Cyberpunk films
American dystopian films
Films about consciousness transfer
Films about time travel
Films based on American novels
Films based on science fiction novels
Films set in 1991
Films set in 2009
Films set in New York City
Films set in the future
Films shot in Atlanta
Morgan Creek Productions films
Warner Bros. films
Films directed by Geoff Murphy
Films with screenplays by Steven Pressfield
Films with screenplays by Dan Gilroy
Films scored by Trevor Jones
Films produced by Ronald Shusett
Films with screenplays by Ronald Shusett
1990s English-language films
1990s American films